Juwad Asaad Rasol Shitnah (born 4 October 1940 in Rawanduz – 24 May 1982 in Baghdad) was an Iraqi regular military officer. He served as commander of the 3rd Armored Division during Iran–Iraq War. He was executed After the Iraqi army defeat at Khorramshahr in 1982.

References

1940 births
1982 deaths
Iraqi generals
Iraqi soldiers
Assassinated military personnel
Iraqi military personnel of the Iran–Iraq War
Deaths by firearm in Iraq
People murdered in Iraq
People from Erbil Governorate
Capital punishment in Iraq
Kurdish military personnel
Iraqi Kurdish people
20th-century executions by Iraq